Radom District was one of the first four Nazi districts of the General Governorate region of German-occupied Poland during World War II, along with Warsaw District, Lublin District, and Kraków District. To the west it bordered Reichsgau Wartheland and East Upper Silesia.

The district's governors were Karl Lasch from 1939 to 1941, followed by Ernst Kundt until 1945. It is estimated that the district's population in 1940 was approximately 3 million people, including over 300,000 Jews.

References

General Government
History of Świętokrzyskie Voivodeship